Unión Deportiva Horadada Caliche is the local team in Pilar de la Horadada in Spain's  Province of Alicante. U.D. Horadada has several sponsors, including Grupo Caliche and the Town Hall.

Stadium and Kit
The name of their stadium is the Ikomar, named because of its position on a slope . Their kit consists of a red shirt, purple shorts and blue socks.

History
The team was founded in 1972.
They played in the Segunda División B for one season (1992/3), they otherwise have always played in the Tercera División. They have reached the league play-offs twice.
For the start of the 2006/7 season, they changed to Group VI (Valencia) from Group XIII (Murcia). This was due to the Real Federación Española's decision to make all clubs play for their corresponding regional league.

During their brief stint in the Segunda División B, they reached the third round of the Copa del Rey. Their success ended when they lost 1-9 away to Deportivo La Coruña.

Of late the club has been dogged by financial problems. Indeed in July 2007, Horadada were forced to sell their Tercera League status to Villarreal C in order to stave off bankruptcy. In so doing Villarreal C moved from Preferente to Tercera while Horadada moved in the opposite direction.

Season to season

1 season in Segunda División B
22 seasons in Tercera División

Notable former players
 Marcel Lička
 Chris Burns
 Fernando Obama
 Kamil Glik
 Marcin Pontus
 Kamil Wilczek
 Szymon Matuszek

External links
Stadium & Club featured on Blog
Fans Website
Futbolme.com profile

Football clubs in the Valencian Community
Association football clubs established in 1972
Divisiones Regionales de Fútbol clubs
1972 establishments in Spain